The M115 203 mm howitzer, also known as the M115 8-inch Howitzer, and originally the M1 8-inch Howitzer was a towed heavy howitzer developed and used by the United States Army during World War II, the Korean War, and the Vietnam War.

History

During World War I, licensed production of the British 8-inch howitzer Mark VI was undertaken by the Midvale Steel and Ordnance Company, located in the Nicetown neighborhood of Philadelphia, Pennsylvania. Both American and British-manufactured weapons were used by the American Expeditionary Force in France. In 1940, the United States still had 475 Mark VII and Mark VIII 1/2 howitzers in storage, but there are no reports of the Mark VI or other marks being used during World War II.

The original design of the M1 8-inch howitzer started in 1919, and resulted in the M1920 howitzer, but the program lapsed until resurrected in 1927. The T2 and T3 howitzers were prototypes of a partner piece for a new 155 mm gun. The first publicity photographs of the M1-type 8-inch howitzer on its redesigned carriage appeared in 1931, but development was slowed by the Great Depression. The T3 was standardized as the 8 inch Howitzer M1 in 1940. 

Like the British 8-inch howitzer of the First World War (and most other large artillery), the M1 uses a Welin screw for its breech. The carriage was the same as used for the US 155 mm gun and was also adopted by the British for their BL 7.2-inch howitzer. It consists of a split trail with equilibrator assemblies, elevating and traversing mechanisms, a two-axle bogie with eight tires, and a single-axle, single-wheel limber for towing. Four spades, carried on the trails, were used to emplace the weapon. 

The M1 saw U.S. service in World War II, the Korean War, and the Vietnam War. During World War II, the M1 was towed by the Mack 7⅓ ton 6×6 truck or the M4 tractor. 59 battalions were raised during the war, of which 39 saw combat service in Northwest Europe or Italy and three in the Pacific.

In the late 1950s, it was adopted in small numbers by several NATO armies, to fire the W33 (M422/M422A1 shell) and later the W79 nuclear artillery shell, under the NATO nuclear sharing concept, a role which ended when the smallest types of tactical nuclear weapons were removed from service and eliminated. It was also adopted as a field weapon by a number of nations in Europe, the Middle East, and Asia and saw service in the Second Taiwan Strait Crisis and the Croatian War of Independence. In 1962, the M1 was redesignated the M115 Howitzer.

Operators
 : former operator
 : former operator, 14 systems in 1983
 : former operator, 24 systems
 : former operator 1953–1996, 12 systems
 : former operator
 : former operator
 :
 : 20 
 
 : 4 in store 
 : former operator
 : The Armed Forces acquired right after the Korean War in 1953. Began replacing in the late 2000s with the K9 Thunder.
 
 : 28 
 : 8 in store 
 : former operator
 : in Turkey, 60 systems
 : 70 
 : 162

Self-propelling mounts

 The howitzer was mounted on a modified M4 medium tank chassis, in mount M17. The resulting vehicle was initially designated 8 inch Howitzer Motor Carriage T89 and eventually standardized as the 8 inch Howitzer Motor Carriage M43. A total of 48 units were built.
 8 inch Howitzer Motor Carriage T80 – based on T23 Medium Tank chassis, never advanced past proposal stage.
 8 inch Howitzer Motor Carriage T84 – based on T26 Medium Tank chassis, a single pilot was built in 1945.
 The howitzer was mounted on a purpose-built tracked chassis to become the 8 inch Self-Propelled Howitzer M110. Notably, accuracy and rate of fire suffered from having to depress the cannon tube to loading elevation for each round in order to use the track-mounted auto loader, But the later M110A2 version had improved accuracy and ranges.

Ammunition
The howitzer fired separate loading, bagged charge ammunition, with seven different propelling charges, from 1 (the smallest) to 7 (the largest).

See also
 8-inch gun M1
 203 mm howitzer M1931 (B-4)—approximate Soviet equivalent
 BL 7.2-inch howitzer—British equivalent
 List of U.S. Army weapons by supply catalog designation—SNL D-29

Notes

References
 
 
 
 
 
 Missing Lynx
 TM 9-2300 Standard Artillery and fire Control Material (dated Feb. 1944)
 TM 9-335
 TM 9-1350

External links 
 

203 mm artillery
Cold War artillery of the United States
World War II artillery of the United States
World War II field artillery
World War II howitzers
Military equipment introduced in the 1930s